Protemnocyon inflatus is a prehistoric species of mammal in the family Canidae. There is only one known species in the genus Protemnocyon.

Description
Protemnocyon inflatus lived in the early stage of Oligocene era about 33.9-33.3 million years ago. Its fossils were discovered at Cedar Creek (Hat Creek Basin) in Nebraska, United States. Its type is classified as CM 552.

Sources
Fossilworks: Protemnocyon
J. B. Hatcher. 1902. Oligocene Canidae. Memoirs of the Carnegie Museum 1(3):65-106
emnocyon definition/meaning - Omnilexica
A Systematic Revision of Daphoenus and Some Allied Genera - jstor

Bear dogs
Oligocene mammals of North America
Prehistoric carnivorans
Monotypic prehistoric animal genera
Prehistoric carnivoran genera